WLMX (106.1 FM) is a radio station licensed to Okeechobee, Florida, United States. WLMX-FM is also simulcast on 95.1 FM in Fort Pierce on FM translator W236AO. WLMX-FM is owned by BMZ Broadcasting, LLC.  WLMX-FM is a Regional Mexican programmed radio station serving the Treasure Coast and Okeechobee County.

References

External links
 

LMX (FM)
Radio stations established in 2010
2010 establishments in Florida